USS Charlotte (SSN-766), a , is the fourth ship of the United States Navy to be named for Charlotte, North Carolina. The contract to build her was awarded to Newport News Shipbuilding and Dry Dock Company in Newport News, Virginia on 6 February 1987 and her keel was laid down on 17 August 1990. Sponsored by Mrs. Mary McComack, she was launched on 3 October 1992 and commissioned on 16 September 1994. She arrived at her homeport of Pearl Harbor on 17 November 1995.

History

On 29 November 2005, Charlotte arrived in Norfolk, Virginia, having taken the northern route from Pearl Harbor, under the Arctic ice cap.

On 24 October 2007, Charlotte returned to Pearl Harbor from Norfolk Naval Shipyard after nearly two years in a Depot Modernization Period.

Charlotte has completed a total of five Western Pacific deployments. In February 1998, she was deployed to the Persian Gulf as part of a multinational military buildup of naval, air, and land forces that included more than 30 American warships and two carrier battle groups. Charlotte and the other American and British warships were deployed as a deterrent in case Iraqi President Saddam Hussein failed to honor his commitment to the United Nations to allow arms inspectors into Iraq. She completed a six-month deployment to the Western Pacific on 13 May 2016.

Charlotte participated in RIMPAC 2022.

Awards
 (3) Meritorious Unit Commendation
 (2) Battle "E"
 (2) Secretary of the Navy Letter of Commendation
 (2) Navy Unit Commendation
 (1) Engineering "E"
 (1) DC Red

Charlotte in fiction
In Tom Clancy's 1994 book Debt of Honor, USS Charlotte is sunk by the Japanese sub Harushio along with her sister ship .

USS Charlotte also makes an appearance in Dan Brown's 2001 novel Deception Point, where it plays an important role taking covert missions to the Arctic.

USS Charlotte is featured alongside sister ship  in the 2013 John Ringo novel Under A Graveyard Sky.

References 

Los Angeles-class submarines
Nuclear submarines of the United States Navy
1992 ships
Submarines of the United States
Ships built in Newport News, Virginia